Jeremiah Henry Nops (June 23, 1875 – March 26, 1937) was a left-handed pitcher in Major League Baseball. From 1896 to 1901, he played for the Philadelphia Phillies, Baltimore Orioles (NL), Brooklyn Superbas, and Baltimore Orioles (AL). He was 5 feet, 8 inches tall and weighed 168 pounds.

Career
Nops was born in Toledo, Ohio, in 1875. He started his professional baseball career in 1895; that season, he went 12-21 with a 4.01 earned run average in the Western League. The following year, Nops moved on to the Atlantic League's Wilmington Peaches. Pitching 349.2 innings, he went 23-16 with a 2.08 ERA and had a league-leading 199 strikeouts. He then made four late-season starts in the National League and went 3-1.

From 1897 to 1899, Nops pitched for the Baltimore Orioles. He went 20-6 in 1897 and ranked second in the league in winning percentage (.769) and third in ERA (2.81). In 1898, he won 16 games and his ERA rose to 3.56, and in 1899, it went up again to 4.03.

Nops joined the Brooklyn Superbas in 1900 but appeared in just nine games for them. He jumped to the American League's Orioles for the 1901 season and went 12-10. That was his last year in the major leagues. He pitched in the minors from 1904 to 1908.

Nops died in Camden, New Jersey, in 1937.

References

External links

1875 births
1937 deaths
Major League Baseball pitchers
Philadelphia Phillies players
Baltimore Orioles (NL) players
Brooklyn Superbas players
Baltimore Orioles (1901–02) players
Toledo Swamp Angels players
Terre Haute Hottentots players
Wilmington Peaches players
Norwich Witches players
Providence Grays (minor league) players
Providence Clamdiggers (baseball) players
Trenton Tigers players
Bridgeport Orators players
19th-century baseball players
Baseball players from Ohio
Sportspeople from Toledo, Ohio